Kranë (romanized Kraniá) is a village in Vlorë County, southern Albania. At the 2015 local government reform it became part of the municipality of Finiq. It is inhabited solely by Greeks.

History 
In antiquity it was an Epirot town, known as "Elikranon" (Greek: Ελίκρανον). The ancient ruins can be seen even today. The name "Krania" is firstly mentioned in the Chronicle of the Tocco in 1412. In 1856, the Greek scholar Panagiotis Aravantinos writes about the village: «... a village with 15 houses, of Greek origin, the spoken language is Greek and belongs to the diocese of Delvino.»

Thimios Lolis (1880-1961) was born in the village, a Greek chieftain who fought in the Macedonian Struggle in the group of Pavlos Melas, the Autonomous Republic of Northern Epirus, the Balkan Wars and in the Greco-Italian War. A monument to honour him exists in the village. Between 2018-19, the Thimios Lolis monument has been vandalized twice by Albanian nationalists.

Demographics 
In the Defter of the Sanjak of Delvinë from 1431-1432, 4 villages in the area of Vurgu are recorded: Finiki (Finiqi), Vurgo, Jeromi and Krajna, each with very few inhabitants. Among these villages, in the Ottoman register mentioned above typical Albanian names are attested, such as: Gjin, Reçi, Leka, Gjon, Dorza, Meksh Nika and Deda. 

According to a research of 1993, the village had a permanent population of 854, of which all were ethnically Greeks.

References

External links 
Video showing the village

Villages in Vlorë County
Greek communities in Albania